The Wilderness is the seventh studio album by American post-rock band Explosions in the Sky, released on April 1, 2016.

Critical reception

The album has received positive reviews from critics, and Metacritic has assigned it an average score of 80/100 based on 26 critics. Dave Simpson for The Guardian called it a "beautifully understated epic" and rewarded the album 4 out of 5 stars. Johnathan K. Dick, writing for Consequence of Sound stated that, "The Wilderness proves that Explosions in the Sky aren't stuck in any creative rut." and gave the album a B+. Paul Simpson for AllMusic gave the album 4 stars and said, "On The Wilderness, Explosions in the Sky deconstruct and rebuild their sound from the ground up, giving it a revitalized sense of urgency and resulting in some of their most dynamic work yet." Pitchfork rewarded the album 8/10 and said it is "their best since The Earth is Not a Cold Dead Place."

However, some critics gave the album mixed reviews. Mojo, in their May 2016 issue, stated that "Although recognisably, and powerfully, the work of Explosions In The Sky this is now a band whose music undulates."

The cover and insert artwork are parts of a painting entitled "8th and Main" by Jacob van Loon.

Accolades

Track listing

Charts

References

2016 albums
Explosions in the Sky albums
Temporary Residence Limited albums
Albums produced by John Congleton